Árpád Fazekas (23 June 1930 – 10 August 2018) was a Hungarian international footballer who played as a goalkeeper.

Career
Born in Szombathely, Fazekas played for Budapesti Dózsa, Vörös Lobogo, Bayern Munich, Hessen Kassel, Anderlecht and RC Tirlemont.

Following the Hungarian Revolution of 1956, he left Hungary and joined Bayern Munich. In 1960 when Dynamo was visiting Bayern he told Yozhef Sabo to stay in Munich. He said that he has his own two stories house and a store in Munich.

He earned five international caps for the Hungarian national team.

Later life and death
He died in Budapest on 10 August 2018, at the age of 88.

References

1930 births
2018 deaths
Hungarian footballers
Hungary international footballers
Újpest FC players
MTK Budapest FC players
FC Bayern Munich footballers
KSV Hessen Kassel players
R.S.C. Anderlecht players
K.V.K. Tienen-Hageland players
Nemzeti Bajnokság I players
Belgian Pro League players
Sportspeople from Szombathely
Association football goalkeepers
Hungarian expatriate footballers
Hungarian expatriate sportspeople in West Germany
Expatriate footballers in West Germany
Hungarian expatriate sportspeople in Belgium
Expatriate footballers in Belgium
20th-century Hungarian people